Gwen Nell Westerman is a Dakota educator, writer and artist. She is a professor at Minnesota State University, Mankato, and the Director of the Native American Literature Symposium. She was appointed by Governor Tim Walz as Poet Laureate of Minnesota in September 2021.

Life and career
Westerman is an enrolled member of the Sisseton Wahpeton Oyate and speaker of the Dakota language. Through her mother, she is also Cherokee and grew up in Kansas. She is Professor of English and Director of the Humanities Program at Minnesota State University, Mankato.

Education
Westerman received a BA and MA in English from Oklahoma State University. She received a PhD in English from the University of Kansas.

Awards
 1999 - Native American Inroads. The Loft, Minneapolis, Minnesota. Mentor:  Diane Glancy.
 1999 - Native American Inroads. The Loft, Minneapolis, Minnesota. Mentor:  Susan Power.
 2004 - Fellowship.  The Smithsonian Institution, National Museum of Natural History. American Indian Programs.  Research project: Traditional Dakota beadwork, under the direction of JoAllyn Archambault, PhD.
 2012 - Douglas R. Moore Research Award Fellow. Minnesota State University, Mankato.
 2012 - Presidential Teaching Scholar. Minnesota State, Mankato.
 2013 - Minnesota Book Award—Minnesota Category.
 2013 - Leadership in History Award. American Association for State and Local History.
 2014 - Hognander Minnesota History Award
 2014 - Distinguished Faculty Scholar, Minnesota State University, Mankato.
 2015 - Native American Artist in Residence at the Minnesota Historical Society

Publications

Books

Articles and chapters

Poetry

Art

References

Further reading

External links

 "Governor Walz, Lieutenant Governor Flanagan Appoint Gwen Nell Westerman as Minnesota Poet Laureate," Gov. official website, September 9, 2021

Living people
American non-fiction writers
American women poets
Oklahoma State University alumni
University of Kansas alumni
Native American women artists
American women non-fiction writers
Year of birth missing (living people)
Sisseton Wahpeton Oyate people
21st-century American women
Poets Laureate of Minnesota
Minnesota State University, Mankato faculty